R-Kive is a CD box set by English veteran progressive rock band Genesis. It was released on 22 September 2014 in the UK, and on 29 September 2014 in the U.S.

It consists of three CDs that span Genesis' career in chronological order. Besides Genesis songs, it includes tracks from solo albums and other projects from members Peter Gabriel, Steve Hackett, Tony Banks, Mike Rutherford, and Phil Collins.

Background

The compilation was intended as a companion to the BBC documentary Genesis: Together and Apart, broadcast in October 2014. The documentary, like the compilation, also features solo efforts as well as the band. The documentary was released in late October 2014 on DVD and Blu-ray under the title of Genesis: Sum of the Parts.

Track listing

Charts

Certifications

References

Genesis (band) compilation albums
2014 compilation albums